The Merritt H. Booker House is a historic house in Culleoka, Tennessee, USA.

History
The house was completed in 1828 for Merrit H. Booker, a Virginia native. It was designed in the Federal architectural style.

In 1880, the house was purchased by Jonas Ingram. It was restored by his grandson, Dan Ingram, in 1963.

Architectural significance
It has been listed on the National Register of Historic Places since July 18, 1985.

References

Houses on the National Register of Historic Places in Tennessee
Federal architecture in Tennessee
Houses completed in 1828
Houses in Maury County, Tennessee
National Register of Historic Places in Maury County, Tennessee